Marie Guilleray (born August 1978) is a vocal performer, improviser and composer currently based in The Hague, Netherlands. 
She performs mainly in free improvisation, experimental and contemporary music. Her work focuses on vocal extended techniques, sound poetry, and the combination of voice and electronics. Currently she is a member of Royal improvisers Orchestra and works on various experimental, improvised and electronic music projects.

Discography

Albums
"Hijas", Heyoky (2004)
"It's over", Ladies and Jazzwomen (2006)
"Lady blues", Ladies and Jazzwomen (2007)

External links 
 Official Site
 Official Myspace

1978 births
Living people
21st-century French singers
21st-century French women singers